The Una River is a river of Bahia state in eastern Brazil. It discharges into the Atlantic Ocean between Canavieiras to the south and Ilhéus to the north.

Tributaries include the Aliança and São Pedro rivers. 
Part of the river basin is in the  Una Biological Reserve, a strictly protected conservation unit in the Una municipality created in 1980.
In its lower reaches the river flows through the western part of the Una Wildlife Refuge, which surrounds the biological reserve.
At least eight of the tributaries rise in the  Serra das Lontras National Park, created in 2010.

See also
List of rivers of Bahia

References

Rivers of Bahia